Ataköy Olympic Pool Stadium was an open-air swimming stadium in Istanbul, Turkey.

The 1999 European Aquatics Championships were held in the 50 m pool. Alongside swimming, aquatic sports included diving, synchronised swimming and open water swimming.

History 
Sinan Erdam built the stadium, as well as other Olympic Pools; e.g. the Sinan Erdam Dome.

The building was destroyed in 2009, but now a bigger sports complex stands there.

References

Coordinates: 40°59′13″N 28°51′20″E

Sports venues in Istanbul